This is a timeline of children's programming on the British ITV network and ITV Digital Channels. The timeline starts in 1980 when ITV launched its first branding for children's programming, although programmes for children had been broadcast on ITV from the earliest years of the network.

1980s 
 1980
 6 June – The final edition of Magpie is broadcast by ITV.  The  magazine format show, intended to compete with the BBC's Blue Peter, ends after twelve years on air.
 29 December – ITV launches its first branded children's slot when it launches Watch It!. The programmes are broadcast on weekdays between 4:15pm to 5:15pm and even though the block is produced by ATV, the links are presented live by the duty continuity announcer in each ITV region.
 1981
 No events.
 1982
 3 April – The final edition of Saturday morning programme Tiswas is shown on ITV. It had been aired, albeit originally as a regional programme made by ATV, since 1974.
 1983
 3 January – Children's ITV is launched, replacing Watch It!. Programmes begin 15 minutes earlier, at 4pm, the extra fifteen minutes being filled by a repeat of one of the pre-school programmes shown at lunchtime the same day. The slot is presented on a national basis and programmes are linked by an in-vision presenter. The links are pre-recorded in advance in a small studio at a London facility called Molinare, using a single locked-off camera and the presenter, usually from the world of children's television, changes on a monthly basis.
 1 February – ITV's breakfast television service TV-am launches and children's programmes are a major part of the service, especially at the weekend.
1 April – Roland Rat makes his first appearance on TV-am. Created by David Claridge and launched by TV-am Children's editor Anne Wood to entertain younger viewers during the Easter holidays. Roland is generally regarded as TV-am's saviour, being described as "the only rat to join a sinking ship".
 April – No. 73 launches nationally as ITV's Saturday morning children's show. It had been shown the previous year as a regional programme by TVS.
1984
 13 October – TV-am launches a new Saturday morning children's series called the  Wide Awake Club. The live programme replaces pre-recorded shows such as Data Run and SPLAT.
1985
 14 September – Wide Awake Club is extended and now runs for two hours, from 7:30am until 9:25am.
3 October – Roland Rat, the puppet rodent who saved an ailing TV-am transfers to the BBC. With only a week until October half term was due to start, TV-am launches Wacaday, a spin-off of the existing and successful Saturday morning programme, Wide Awake Club.
1986
 3 May – The first edition of Get Fresh is broadcast. It alternates with No. 73 as ITV's Saturday morning children's magazine series for the next three years.
1987
 Live presentation of Children's ITV is launched. Previously, all links had been pre-recorded. The links come from Broad Street studios and are presented by former Central announcers Gary Terzza and Debbie Shore.
1988
 March – No. 73 is broadcast for the final time. It had been known as 7T3 since January.
 3 September – Motormouth launches as ITV's new Saturday morning children's programme.
1989
 April – The Wide Awake Club is renamed WAC '90. It is broadcast from Granada's studios in Manchester rather than from TV-am's London studios.
 3 April – The independent production company Stonewall Productions wins the contract to produce Children's ITV presentation. Stonewall chooses not to use a fixed set, but instead presented links from various areas of Central's headquarters at Broad Street in Birmingham, utilising a rotating team of presenters which includes Clive Warren (now a DJ), Jeanne Downs (a singer), Jerry Foulkes (a producer who left Children's ITV on 22 December 1989) and a large puppet dog called Scally (who started out with Mark during his last few months).
 3 September  – The Disney Club is broadcast for the first time. Produced by Scottish Television and went out on Sundays at 9:25am and airs mainly between September and April.

1990s 
 1990
July – Hey, Hey, it's Saturday! replaces Wac '90 as TV-am's flagship Saturday morning children's programme.
 1991
9 April – Central wins back the contract to produce the continuity links, choosing to revert links back to a small in-vision studio and using one regular presenter, Tommy Boyd. 
 September – Children's programme  Hey, Hey, it's Saturday! is axed. It is replaced the following week by TV Mayhem.
 November – Following the loss of its franchise, TV-am scraps all of its original children's programming, replacing it with a new Saturday morning block programme for children called Cartoon World which as the name suggests, only showed cartoons.
 1992
 6 March – After 20 years on air and 1002 episodes, the final new edition of Rainbow is broadcast. The series ends due to its producer Thames Television losing its ITV franchise. Repeats continue to be shown until the end of 1992.
 4 April – The final edition of Saturday morning show Motormouth is broadcast. The programme ends following the announcement that TVS will lose its ITV franchise at the end of 1992.
 5 September – The first edition of ITV's new Saturday morning show What's Up Doc? is broadcast. It alternates with Gimme 5 as ITV's Saturday morning children's show.
 December – Cartoon World ends at the end of TV-am's licence to broadcast ITV's breakfast television output.
 1993
1 January – Good Morning Television takes over the breakfast television franchise from TV-am and like its predecessor, children's programmes dominate weekend programming. Among the programmes is Saturday Disney which overlaps past its 9:25am cut off time. It continues to be produced by Scottish Television which was one of the owners of GMTV at the time. Also, a programme for younger children, Rise and Shine airs from 6am until the start of Saturday Disney.
15 February – In-vision presentation is dropped by the first Network Centre controller of children's and daytime programming Dawn Airey (a former Central management trainee) with Steven Ryde providing live out-of-vision continuity links featuring a wide variety of animated characters.
 6 September – CITV's afternoon slot is extended to start at 3:30pm, when ITV network centre decided to move the pre-school children slot from 12:10pm. Around the same time, the Children's ITV name is changed to CITV, having been used in some form or another since the previous year.
 1994
 No events.
 1995
 January – The Disney Club moves back once again to 9:25am with Disney Adventures starting at 8am with Sally Gray presenting.
 29 April – The final edition of Saturday morning show What's Up Doc? is broadcast. It is replaced the following Saturday by a new programme Scratchy & Co..
 1996
 30 March – Saturday Disney is broadcast on GMTV for the final time.
 1997
 No events.
 1998
 14 March – Diggit launches as GMTV's flagship children's programming block. It is broadcast from 7:10am to 9:25am on Saturdays and 8am to 9:25am on Sundays. Additional editions on Bank Holidays and Summer holidays were shown under the name Diggit Extra.
 25 April – Scratchy & Co. is broadcast for the final time.
 26 April – The Disney Club ends after nearly nine years replaced by Diggit.
 25 May – A new in-vision service is introduced by the new controller of ITV children's output, Nigel Pickard. Stephen Mulhern and Danielle Nicholls are the new presentation team.
 29 August – SMTV Live makes its debut as ITV's Saturday morning children's programme.
 15 November – The public launch of digital terrestrial TV in the UK takes place with the launch of OnDigital and as part of the 19-channel line-up, Carlton creates three new channels for the platform, including a daytime channel for children,  Carlton Kids.
 1999
 4 January – GMTV2 launches during the breakfast downtime of ITV2 and children's programmes form a major part of the new service.

2000s 
 2000
 31 January – Carlton Kids stops broadcasting.
 2001
 CITV's budget is cut by 17% due to the advertising recession, leading to CITV's controller Janie Grace publicly criticising Carlton and Granada Television, then the main controlling forces in the network, for underinvestment in ITV's children's service. 
 A new strand for pre-school children is introduced from 3:25pm every afternoon under the name "CITV's Telly Tots". The in-house presentation is dropped and replaced with a CGI animated town using a plane, a car and a postbox as its mascots. A child voiceover is used to introduce its pre-school shows.
 2002
  Further cuts take place during 2002, bringing the total cutback to 25% of the overall budget.
 2003
 27 December – SMTV Live is broadcast for the final time. It is cancelled due to falling ratings.
 2004
 10 January – The first edition of ITV's new Saturday morning children's programme Ministry of Mayhem is broadcast on ITV, later on CITV.
 31 August – All in-vision continuity is replaced by voiceover, ahead of the closure of its presentation and transmission facilities in Birmingham.
2005
 5 February – Diggin' It and Up on The Roof are merged into a new programme called Toonattik. It is broadcast on Saturdays and Sundays from 7:25am until GMTV's closedown at 9:25am.
 Further cutbacks to children's programming on ITV take place.
 2006
 7 January – Ministry of Mayhem is relaunched as Holly & Stephen's Saturday Showdown.
 11 March – CITV Channel launches on Freeview, Home Choice and Telewest. It starts broadcasting on Sky on 8 May and on NTL on 6 June.
 June – ITV closes down its in-house children's production unit, as part of ITV's then on-going process of restructuring ITV Productions and blames the closure on the competitive production environment, though ITV denied any intention of ditching its children's programming from its network schedule.
 1 July – After nearly 25 years, ITV ends its broadcasting of children's programmes on its flagship channel (with the exception of the ITV Breakfast simulcasts) when it airs the final edition of Holly & Stephen's Saturday Showdown as from the following week, cookery programmes air on ITV on Saturday mornings.
 At the end of 2006, CITV ends on ITV after 23 years on air, with the exception of the ITV Breakfast simulcasts.
 2007
 No events.
 2008
 No events.
 2009
 2 November – CITV Channel is relaunched, with a new logo and new branding to match ITV1 as part of ITV plc's corporate look. Mini CITV is launched to house CITV's pre-school programming.

2010s
2010
 26 December –  The final edition of Toonattik is broadcast.
2011
 2 January - CITV Channel launched on Freesat channel 602.
2012
 21 December – CITV goes live for the first time in 6 years with a special 45 minute edition of Text Santa.
2013
 7 January – The Mini CITV name and the Mini mascots are dropped from on-screen use.
 14 January – CITV gets a new logo to match its rebranded sister channels.
2014
 18 January – The first edition of weekend breakfast show Scrambled! is broadcast.
2015
  7 January – CITV withdraws from all of its pre-school programmings from both its weekday and weekend schedules with the exception of Sooty.
2016
 21 February – CITV's broadcast hours are extended into the early evening with programmes continuing until 9pm rather than 6pm.
2017
 No events.
2018
 3 September – LittleBe launches on ITVBe. It broadcasts at the start of the day and is aimed at 2-6 year-olds. The block airs at 9am to 12pm on weekends and weekdays and Sooty is moved from CITV to LittleBe
2019
 October – CITV partner with the BFI in their Young Audiences Content Fund to deliver more UK originated programming.

2020s
2020
 No events.

2021
 11 April – The final edition of Scrambled! is broadcast.

2022
 No events.

2023
 10 March – ITV announces plans to wind down CITV and transition its children's output to a predominantly online model.
 September –  The CITV Channel will close. A morning block of children's programming will be introduced on ITV2, serving primarily to promote the ITVX offering, and the LittleBe strand within ITVBe will continue.

See also 
 Timeline of children's television on the BBC
 Timeline of children's television on other British TV channels

References

ITV timelines
Television in the United Kingdom by year